Aigali  is a village in the southern state of Karnataka, India. It is located in the Athani taluk of Belgaum district in Karnataka.

Temples
 Appayya Swami Temple Aigali

 Manik Prabhu Temple
Rudrapashupati Temple near masuti
Shree Basaveshwara Temple at the heart of the village. Gopuram for temple is built recently.
Shree Virhala Mandira is renovated during 2018 situated near Grama Panchayati.
A new Temple is built by life time savings of Shree Sharana Mallappa Narasappa Sindur on his own land For Shree Appayya Swamiji. A Committee is formed to look after and development of this temple.

Demographics
 India census, Aigali had a population of 7425 with 3807 males and 3618 females.

See also
 Belgaum
 Districts of Karnataka

References

External links
 http://Belgaum.nic.in/

Villages in Belagavi district